Palestine, officially the State of Palestine, is a state located in the Southern Levant, Western Asia. Officially governed by the Palestine Liberation Organization (PLO), it claims the West Bank (including East Jerusalem) and the Gaza Strip as its territory, though the entirety of that territory has been under Israeli occupation since the 1967 Six-Day War. As a result of the Oslo Accords of 1993–1995, the West Bank is currently divided into 165 Palestinian enclaves that are under partial Palestinian National Authority (PNA) rule; the remainder, including 200 Israeli settlements, is under full Israeli control. The Gaza Strip has been ruled by the militant Islamic group Hamas and has been subject to a long-term blockade by Egypt and Israel since 2007.

After World War II, in 1947, the United Nations (UN) adopted a Partition Plan for Mandatory Palestine, which recommended the creation of independent Arab and Jewish states and an internationalized Jerusalem. This Partition Plan was accepted by the Jews but rejected by the Arabs. Immediately after the United Nations General Assembly adopted the plan as Resolution 181, a civil war broke out and the plan was not implemented. The day after the establishment of the State of Israel on 14 May 1948, neighboring Arab countries invaded the former British Mandate and engaged Israeli forces in the First Arab–Israeli War. Later, the All-Palestine Government was established by the Arab League on 22 September 1948 to govern the All-Palestine Protectorate in the Egyptian-occupied Gaza Strip. It was soon recognized by all Arab League members except Transjordan, which had occupied and later annexed the West Bank, including East Jerusalem. Palestine is currently recognized by 138 of the 193 United Nations (UN) member states. Though jurisdiction of the All-Palestine Government was declared to cover the whole of the former Mandatory Palestine, its effective jurisdiction was limited to the Gaza Strip. Israel later captured the Gaza Strip and the Sinai Peninsula from Egypt, the West Bank and East Jerusalem from Jordan, and the Golan Heights from Syria during the Six-Day War in June 1967.

On 15 November 1988 in Algiers, then-Chairman of the PLO Yasser Arafat proclaimed the establishment of the State of Palestine. A year after the signing of the Oslo Accords in 1993, the PNA was formed to govern (in varying degrees) areas A and B in the West Bank, comprising 165 enclaves, and the Gaza Strip. After Hamas became the PNA parliament's leading party in the most recent elections (2006), a conflict broke out between it and the Fatah party, leading to Gaza being taken over by Hamas in 2007 (two years after the Israeli disengagement).

The State of Palestine's mid-year population in 2021 is 5,227,193. Although Palestine claims Jerusalem as its capital, the city is under the control of Israel; both Palestinian and Israeli claims to the city are mostly unrecognized by the international community. Palestine is a member of the Arab League, the Organisation of Islamic Cooperation, the G77, the International Olympic Committee, as well as UNESCO, UNCTAD and the International Criminal Court. Following a failed attempt in 2011 to secure full United Nations member state status, the United Nations General Assembly voted in 2012 to recognize Palestine as a non-member observer state.

Etymology 

Although the concept of the Palestine region and its geographical extent has varied throughout history, it is now considered to be composed by the modern State of Israel, the West Bank and the Gaza Strip. General use of the term "Palestine" or related terms to the area at the southeast corner of the Mediterranean Sea beside Syria has historically been taking place since the times of Ancient Greece, with Herodotus being the first historian writing in the 5th century BC in The Histories of a "district of Syria, called Palaistine" in which Phoenicians interacted with other maritime peoples. The term "Palestine" (in Latin, Palæstina) is thought to have been a term coined by the Ancient Greeks for the area of land occupied by the Philistines, although there are other explanations.

Terminology 
This article uses the terms "Palestine", "State of Palestine", "occupied Palestinian territory" (oPt or OPT) interchangeably depending on context. Specifically, the term "occupied Palestinian territory" refers as a whole to the geographical area of the Palestinian territory occupied by Israel since 1967. In all cases, any references to land or territory refer to land claimed by the State of Palestine.

History 

In 1947, the UN adopted a partition plan for a two-state solution in the remaining territory of the mandate. The plan was accepted by the Jewish leadership but rejected by the Arab leaders, and Britain refused to implement the plan. On the eve of final British withdrawal, the Jewish Agency for Israel, headed by David Ben-Gurion, declared the establishment of the State of Israel according to the proposed UN plan. The Arab Higher Committee did not declare a state of its own and instead, together with Transjordan, Egypt, and the other members of the Arab League of the time, commenced military action resulting in the 1948 Arab–Israeli War. During the war, Israel gained additional territories that were designated to be part of the Arab state under the UN plan. Egypt occupied the Gaza Strip and Transjordan occupied and then annexed the West Bank. Egypt initially supported the creation of an All-Palestine Government but disbanded it in 1959. Transjordan never recognized it and instead decided to incorporate the West Bank with its own territory to form Jordan. The annexation was ratified in 1950 but was rejected by the international community. The Six-Day War in 1967, when Israel fought against Egypt, Jordan, and Syria, ended with Israel occupying the West Bank and the Gaza Strip, besides other territories.

In 1964, when the West Bank was controlled by Jordan, the Palestine Liberation Organization was established there with the goal to confront Israel. The Palestinian National Charter of the PLO defines the boundaries of Palestine as the whole remaining territory of the mandate, including Israel. Following the Six-Day War, the PLO moved to Jordan, but later relocated to Lebanon in 1971.

The October 1974 Arab League summit designated the PLO as the "sole legitimate representative of the Palestinian people" and reaffirmed "their right to establish an independent state of urgency." In November 1974, the PLO was recognized as competent on all matters concerning the question of Palestine by the UN General Assembly granting them observer status as a "non-state entity" at the UN. After the 1988 Declaration of Independence, the UN General Assembly officially acknowledged the proclamation and decided to use the designation "Palestine" instead of "Palestine Liberation Organization" in the UN. In spite of this decision, the PLO did not participate at the UN in its capacity of the State of Palestine's government.

In 1979, through the Camp David Accords, Egypt signaled an end to any claim of its own over the Gaza Strip. In July 1988, Jordan ceded its claims to the West Bank—with the exception of guardianship over Haram al-Sharif—to the PLO. In November 1988, the PLO legislature, while in exile, declared the establishment of the "State of Palestine". In the month following, it was quickly recognised by many states, including Egypt and Jordan. In the Palestinian Declaration of Independence, the State of Palestine is described as being established on the "Palestinian territory", without explicitly specifying further. Because of this, some of the countries that recognised the State of Palestine in their statements of recognition refer to the "1967 borders", thus recognizing as its territory only the occupied Palestinian territory, and not Israel. The UN membership application submitted by the State of Palestine also specified that it is based on the "1967 borders". During the negotiations of the Oslo Accords, the PLO recognised Israel's right to exist, and Israel recognised the PLO as representative of the Palestinian people. The 1988 Palestinian Declaration of Independence included a PNC call for multilateral negotiations on the basis of UN Security Council Resolution 242 later known as "the Historic Compromise", implying acceptance of a two-state solution and no longer questioning the legitimacy of the State of Israel.

After Israel captured and occupied of the West Bank from Jordan and Gaza Strip from Egypt, it began to establish Israeli settlements there. Administration of the Arab population of these territories was performed by the Israeli Civil Administration of the Coordinator of Government Activities in the Territories and by local municipal councils present since before the Israeli takeover. In 1980, Israel decided to freeze elections for these councils and to establish instead Village Leagues, whose officials were under Israeli influence. Later this model became ineffective for both Israel and the Palestinians, and the Village Leagues began to break up, with the last being the Hebron League, dissolved in February 1988.

In 1993, in the Oslo Accords, Israel acknowledged the PLO negotiating team as "representing the Palestinian people", in return for the PLO recognizing Israel's right to exist in peace, acceptance of UN Security Council resolutions 242 and 338, and its rejection of "violence and terrorism". As a result, in 1994 the PLO established the Palestinian National Authority (PNA or PA) territorial administration, that exercises some governmental functions in parts of the West Bank and the Gaza Strip. In 2007, the Hamas takeover of Gaza Strip politically and territorially divided the Palestinians, with Abbas's Fatah left largely ruling the West Bank and recognized internationally as the official Palestinian Authority, while Hamas secured its control over the Gaza Strip. In April 2011, the Palestinian parties signed an agreement of reconciliation, but its implementation had stalled until a unity government was formed on 2 June 2014.

As envisioned in the Oslo Accords, Israel allowed the PLO to establish interim administrative institutions in the Palestinian territories, which came in the form of the PNA. It was given civilian control in Area B and civilian and security control in Area A, and remained without involvement in Area C. In 2005, following the implementation of Israel's unilateral disengagement plan, the PNA gained full control of the Gaza Strip with the exception of its borders, airspace, and territorial waters. Following the inter-Palestinian conflict in 2006, Hamas took over control of the Gaza Strip (it already had majority in the PLC), and Fatah took control of the West Bank. From 2007, the Gaza Strip was governed by Hamas, and the West Bank by Fatah.

International recognition

The State of Palestine has been recognized by 138 of the 193 UN members and since 2012 has had a status of a non-member observer state in the United Nations.

On 29 November 2012, in a 138–9 vote (with 41 abstentions and 5 absences), the United Nations General Assembly passed resolution 67/19, upgrading Palestine from an "observer entity" to a "non-member observer state" within the United Nations System, which was described as recognition of the PLO's sovereignty. Palestine's new status is equivalent to that of the Holy See.

The UN has permitted Palestine to title its representative office to the UN as "The Permanent Observer Mission of the State of Palestine to the United Nations", and Palestine has instructed its diplomats to officially represent "The State of Palestine"—no longer the Palestinian National Authority. On 17 December 2012, UN Chief of Protocol Yeocheol Yoon declared that "the designation of 'State of Palestine' shall be used by the Secretariat in all official United Nations documents", thus recognising the title 'State of Palestine' as the state's official name for all UN purposes; on 21 December 2012, a UN memorandum discussed appropriate terminology to be used following GA 67/19. It was noted therein that there was no legal impediment to using the designation Palestine to refer to the geographical area of the Palestinian territory. At the same time, it was explained that there was also no bar to the continued use of the term "Occupied Palestinian Territory including East Jerusalem" or such other terminology as might customarily be used by the Assembly.  of the  member states of the United Nations have recognised the State of Palestine. Many of the countries that do not recognise the State of Palestine nevertheless recognise the PLO as the "representative of the Palestinian people". The PLO's Executive Committee is empowered by the Palestinian National Council to perform the functions of government of the State of Palestine.

Geography 

The areas claimed by the State of Palestine lie in the Southern Levant. The Gaza Strip borders the Mediterranean Sea to the west, Egypt to the south, and Israel to the north and east. The West Bank is bordered by Jordan to the east, and Israel to the north, south, and west. Thus, the two enclaves constituting the area claimed by State of Palestine have no geographical border with one another, being separated by Israel. These areas would constitute the world's 163rd largest country by land area.

Palestine has a number of environmental issues; issues facing the Gaza Strip include desertification; salination of fresh water; sewage treatment; water-borne diseases; soil degradation; and depletion and contamination of underground water resources. In the West Bank, many of the same issues apply; although fresh water is much more plentiful, access is restricted by the ongoing dispute.

Three terrestrial ecoregions are found in the area: Eastern Mediterranean conifer–sclerophyllous–broadleaf forests, Arabian Desert, and Mesopotamian shrub desert.

Climate 
Temperatures in Palestine vary widely. The climate in the West Bank is mostly Mediterranean, slightly cooler at elevated areas compared with the shoreline, west to the area. In the east, the West Bank includes much of the Judean Desert including the western shoreline of the Dead Sea, characterised by dry and hot climate. Gaza has a hot semi-arid climate (Köppen: BSh) with mild winters and dry hot summers. Spring arrives around March–April and the hottest months are July and August, with the average high being .

Government and politics 

The State of Palestine consists of the following institutions that are associated with the Palestine Liberation Organization (PLO):
 President of the State of Palestine – appointed by the Palestinian Central Council
 Palestinian National Council – the legislature that established the State of Palestine
 Executive Committee of the Palestine Liberation Organization – performs the functions of a government in exile, maintaining an extensive foreign-relations network

These should be distinguished from the President of the Palestinian National Authority, Palestinian Legislative Council (PLC) and PNA Cabinet, all of which are instead associated with the Palestinian National Authority.

The State of Palestine's founding document is the Palestinian Declaration of Independence, and it should be distinguished from the unrelated PLO Palestinian National Covenant and PNA Palestine Basic Law.

Law and security 

The State of Palestine has a number of security forces, including a Civil Police Force, National Security Forces and Intelligence Services, with the function of maintaining security and protecting Palestinian citizens and the Palestinian State.

Administrative divisions 

The State of Palestine is divided into sixteen administrative divisions.

The governorates in the West Bank are grouped into three areas per the Oslo II Accord. Area A forms 18% of the West Bank by area, and is administered by the Palestinian government. Area B forms 22% of the West Bank, and is under Palestinian civil control, and joint Israeli-Palestinian security control. Area C, except East Jerusalem, forms 60% of the West Bank, and is administered by the Israeli Civil Administration, except that the Palestinian government provides the education and medical services to the 150,000 Palestinians in the area. More than 99% of Area C is off limits to Palestinians. There are about 330,000 Israelis living in settlements in Area C. Although Area C is under martial law, Israelis living there are entitled to full civic rights.

East Jerusalem (comprising the small pre-1967 Jordanian eastern-sector Jerusalem municipality together with a significant area of the pre-1967 West Bank demarcated by Israel in 1967) is administered as part of the Jerusalem District of Israel but is claimed by Palestine as part of the Jerusalem Governorate. It was effectively annexed by Israel in 1967, by application of Israeli law, jurisdiction and administration under a 1948 law amended for the purpose, this purported annexation being constitutionally reaffirmed (by implication) in Basic Law: Jerusalem 1980, but this annexation is not recognised by any other country. In 2010 of the 456,000 people in East Jerusalem, roughly 60% were Palestinians and 40% were Israelis. However, since the late 2000s, Israel's West Bank Security Barrier has effectively re-annexed tens of thousands of Palestinians bearing Israeli ID cards to the West Bank, leaving East Jerusalem within the barrier with a small Israeli majority (60%).

Foreign relations 

Representation of the State of Palestine is performed by the Palestine Liberation Organization (PLO). In states that recognise the State of Palestine it maintains embassies. The Palestine Liberation Organization is represented in various international organizations as member, associate or observer. Because of inconclusiveness in sources in some cases it is impossible to distinguish whether the participation is executed by the PLO as representative of the State of Palestine, by the PLO as a non-state entity or by the PNA.

On 15 December 1988, the State of Palestine's declaration of independence of November 1988 was acknowledged in the General Assembly with Resolution 43/177.

On 29 November 2012, UN General Assembly resolution 67/19 passed, upgrading Palestine to "non-member observer state" status in the United Nations. The change in status was described as "de facto recognition of the sovereign state of Palestine".

In 2013 the Swedish Parliament upgraded the status of the Palestinian representative office in the country to full embassy status. On 3 October 2014, new Swedish Prime Minister Stefan Löfven used his inaugural address in parliament to announce that Sweden would recognise the state of Palestine. The official decision to do so was made on 30 October, making Sweden the first EU member state outside of the former communist bloc to recognise the state of Palestine. Most of the EU's 27 member states have refrained from recognising Palestinian statehood and those that do—such as Hungary, Poland, and Slovakia—did so before accession. In February 2015, Mahmoud Abbas visited Sweden to open the new embassy, and Löfven said "According to our view, Palestine is from now on a state."

On 13 October 2014, the UK House of Commons voted by 274 to 12 in favour of recognising Palestine as a state. The House of Commons backed the move "as a contribution to securing a negotiated two-state solution"—although less than half of MPs took part in the vote. However, the UK government is not bound to do anything as a result of the vote: its current policy is that it "reserves the right to recognise a Palestinian state bilaterally at the moment of our choosing and when it can best help bring about peace".

On 2 December 2014, the French parliament voted by 331 to 151 in favour of urging their government to recognise Palestine as a state. The text, proposed by the ruling Socialists and backed by left-wing parties and some conservatives, asked the government to "use the recognition of a Palestinian state with the aim of resolving the conflict definitively".

On 31 December 2014, the United Nations Security Council voted down a resolution demanding the end of Israeli occupation and statehood by 2017. Eight members voted for the Resolution (Russia, China, France, Argentina, Chad, Chile, Jordan, Luxembourg), however following strenuous US and Israeli efforts to defeat the resolution, it did not get the minimum of nine votes needed to pass the resolution. Australia and the United States voted against the resolution, with five other nations abstaining.

On 16 January 2015, the International Criminal Court announced that, since Palestine was granted observer State status in the UN by the UNGA, it must be considered a "State" for the purposes of accession to the Rome Statute.

On 13 May 2015, the Vatican announced it was shifting recognition from the PLO to the State of Palestine, confirming recognition of Palestine as a state after the UN vote of 2012. Monsignor Antoine Camilleri, Vatican foreign minister, said the change was in line with the evolving position of the Holy See, which has referred unofficially to the State of Palestine since Pope Francis's visit to the Holy Land in May 2014.

On 23 December 2015, the UN General Assembly adopted a resolution demanding Palestinian sovereignty over the natural resources in the Palestinian territories under Israeli occupation. It called on Israel to desist from the exploitation, damage, cause of loss or depletion and endangerment of Palestinian natural resources, the right of Palestinians to seek restitution for extensive destruction. The motion was passed by 164 votes to 5, with Canada, Federated States of Micronesia, Israel, Marshall Islands, and the United States opposing.

 of the  member states of the United Nations have recognised the State of Palestine. Many of the countries that do not recognise the State of Palestine nevertheless recognise the PLO as the "representative of the Palestinian people". The PLO's executive committee is empowered by the PNC to perform the functions of government of the State of Palestine.

Legal status 

There are a wide variety of views regarding the status of the State of Palestine, both among the states of the international community and among legal scholars. The existence of a state of Palestine, although controversial, is a reality in the opinions of the states that have established bilateral diplomatic relations.

Raising the flag at the UN 

In August 2015, Palestine's representatives at the UN presented a draft resolution that would allow the non-member observer states Palestine and the Holy See to raise their flags at the United Nations headquarters. Initially, the Palestinians presented their initiative as a joint effort with the Holy See, which the Holy See denied.

In a letter to the Secretary General and the President of the General Assembly, Israel's Ambassador at the UN Ron Prosor called the step "another cynical misuse of the UN ... in order to score political points".

After the vote, which was passed by 119 votes to 8 with 45 countries abstaining, the US Ambassador Samantha Power said that "raising the Palestinian flag will not bring Israelis and Palestinians any closer together". US Department of State spokesman Mark Toner called it a "counterproductive" attempt to pursue statehood claims outside of a negotiated settlement.

At the ceremony itself, U.N. Secretary-General Ban Ki-moon said the occasion was a "day of pride for the Palestinian people around the world, a day of hope", and declared "Now is the time to restore confidence by both Israelis and Palestinians for a peaceful settlement and, at last, the realization of two states for two peoples."

Demographics

Population 
According to the Palestinian Central Bureau of Statistics (PCBS), as of 26 May 2021, the State of Palestine 2021 mid year population is 5,227,193. Ala Owad, PCBS President, estimated a population of 5.3 million as of end year 2021. To put this in a wider context, the average population density of the world was 25 people per square kilometre as of 2017.

Healthcare 

According to the Palestinian Ministry of Health (MOH), as of 2017, there were 743 primary health care centers in Palestine (583 in the West Bank and 160 in Gaza), and 81 hospitals (51 in the West Bank, including East Jerusalem, and 30 in Gaza).

Operating under the auspices of the World Health Organization (WHO), the Health Cluster for the occupied Palestinian territory (oPt) was established in 2009 and represents a partnership of over 70 local and international nongovernmental organisations and UN agencies providing a framework for health actors involved in the humanitarian response for the oPt. The Cluster is co-chaired by the MOH to ensure alignment with national policies and plans.
The report of WHO Director-General of 1 May 2019 describes health sector conditions in the oPt identifying strategic priorities and current obstacles to their achievement pursuant to the country cooperation strategy for WHO and the Occupied Palestinian Territory 2017–2020.

Education 

The literacy rate of Palestine was 96.3% according to a 2014 report by the United Nations Development Programme, which is high by international standards. There is a gender difference in the population aged above 15 with 5.9% of women considered illiterate compared to 1.6% of men. Illiteracy among women has fallen from 20.3% in 1997 to less than 6% in 2014.

Religion 

93% of Palestinians are Muslim, the vast majority of whom are followers of the Sunni branch of Islam, with a small minority of Ahmadiyya, and 15% being nondenominational Muslims. Palestinian Christians represent a significant minority of 6%, followed by much smaller religious communities, including Druze and Samaritans.

Economy

Tourism 

Tourism in the territory claimed by the State of Palestine refers to tourism in East Jerusalem, the West Bank and the Gaza Strip. In 2010, 4.6 million people visited the Palestinian territories, compared to 2.6 million in 2009. Of that number, 2.2 million were foreign tourists while 2.7 million were domestic. Most tourists come for only a few hours or as part of a day trip itinerary. In the last quarter of 2012 over 150,000 guests stayed in West Bank hotels; 40% were European and 9% were from the United States and Canada. Lonely Planet travel guide writes that "the West Bank is not the easiest place in which to travel but the effort is richly rewarded." In 2013 Palestinian Authority Tourism minister Rula Ma'ay'a stated that her government aims to encourage international visits to Palestine, but the occupation is the main factor preventing the tourism sector from becoming a major income source to Palestinians. There are no visa conditions imposed on foreign nationals other than those imposed by the visa policy of Israel. Access to Jerusalem, the West Bank, and Gaza is completely controlled by the Government of Israel. Entry to the occupied Palestinian territories requires only a valid international passport.

Communications 

The Palestinian Central Bureau of Statistics (PCBS) and the Ministry of Telecom and Information Technology said there were 4.2 million cellular mobile subscribers in Palestine compared to 2.6 million at the end of 2010 while the number of ADSL subscribers in Palestine increased to about 363 thousand by the end of 2019 from 119 thousand over the same period. 97% of Palestinian households have at least one cellular mobile line while at least one smartphone is owned by 86% of households (91% in the West Bank and 78% in Gaza Strip). About 80% of the Palestinian households have access to the internet in their homes and about a third have a computer.
On 12 June 2020, the World Bank approved a US$15 million grant for the Technology for Youth and Jobs (TechStart) Project aiming to help the Palestinian IT sector upgrade the capabilities of firms and create more high-quality jobs. Kanthan Shankar, World Bank Country Director for West Bank and Gaza said "The IT sector has the potential to make a strong contribution to economic growth. It can offer opportunities to Palestinian youth, who constitute 30% of the population and suffer from acute unemployment."

Financial services 

The Palestine Monetary Authority has issued guidelines for the operation and provision of electronic payment services including e-wallet and prepaid cards.

Transportation

Water supply and sanitation 

Water supply and sanitation in the Palestinian territories are characterized by severe water shortage and are highly influenced by the Israeli occupation. The water resources of Palestine are fully controlled by Israel and the division of groundwater is subject to provisions in the Oslo II Accord.

Generally, the water quality is considerably worse in the Gaza strip when compared to the West Bank. About a third to half of the delivered water in the Palestinian territories is lost in the distribution network. The lasting blockade of the Gaza Strip and the Gaza War have caused severe damage to the infrastructure in the Gaza Strip.
Concerning wastewater, the existing treatment plants do not have the capacity to treat all of the produced wastewater, causing severe water pollution. The development of the sector highly depends on external financing.

Culture

Media 
There are a number of newspapers, news agencies, and satellite television stations in the State of Palestine. Its news agencies include Ma'an News Agency, Wafa, Palestine News Network. Al-Aqsa TV, Al-Quds TV, Sanabel TV are its main satellite broadcasters.

Sports 

Association football (soccer) is the most popular sport among the Palestinian people. The Palestine national football team represents the state in international football. Rugby is also a popular sport.

Art, music, and clothing

See also 

 Flag of Palestine
 Geography of the State of Palestine
 International recognition of the State of Palestine
 Israeli settlement
 Israeli-occupied territories
 Palestine (region)
 Palestinian self-determination

Notes

References

Citations

Bibliography 

 
 
 Gerson, Allan (1978). Israel, the West Bank and International Law. London: Frank Cass. .
 
 
  p. 49 p. 279 p. 291 p. 294

Further reading 

 
 
 
 Shatz, Adam, "We Are Conquerors" (review of Tom Segev, A State at Any Cost: The Life of David Ben-Gurion, Head of Zeus, 2019, 804 pp.), London Review of Books, vol. 41, no. 20 (24 October 2019), pp. 37–38, 40–42. "Segev's biography... shows how central exclusionary nationalism, war and racism were to Ben-Gurion's vision of the Jewish homeland in Palestine, and how contemptuous he was not only of the Arabs but of Jewish life outside Zion. [Liberal Jews] may look at the state that Ben-Gurion built, and ask if the cost has been worth it." (p. 42 of Shatz's review.)

External links 
 Status of Palestine in the United Nations (A/RES/67/19) Full Text
 Cross, Tony (24 September 2011). "After Abbas's UN Bid Are Palestinians Closer To Having a State?". Radio France Internationale. Retrieved 2011-9-28.
 Recognition of a Palestinian state Premature Legally Invalid and Undermining any Bona Fide Negotiation Process
 Political Statement accompanying Palestinian Declaration of Independence
 Permanent Observer Mission of Palestine to the United Nations
 The Historic Compromise: The Palestinian Declaration of Independence and the Twenty-Year Struggle for a Two-State Solution
 International Recognition of a Unilaterally Declared Palestinian State: Legal and Policy Dilemmas, by Tal Becker

State of Palestine
Arabic-speaking countries and territories
Eastern Mediterranean
Levant
Member states of the Organisation of Islamic Cooperation
Middle Eastern countries
Near Eastern countries
Western Asian countries
Republics
Two-state solution
United Nations General Assembly observers
States and territories established in 1988
1988 establishments in Asia
Countries in Asia
States with limited recognition